KHOP is an FM radio station serving the Modesto and Stockton areas. It broadcasts on FM frequency 95.1 and is under ownership of Cumulus Media. KHOP refers to itself as KHOP @ 95-1 or All The Hits. Its studios are in Stockton and its transmitter is located northeast of Oakdale, California.

KHOP plays mostly pop music. It was once referred to as "The Pop Music Channel", but has dropped that slogan in favor of "All the Hits." Prior to the switch to a pop music format, KHOP had a rock format focusing mostly on hard rock from the 1970s and '80s. Before being a rock station, KHOP was an alternative music channel and switched in the mid-90s by advertising their own demise prior to the station's format change. This included a live "cable cutting" show shortly before the format change.

External links
KHOP @ 95-1 - official website

HOP
Contemporary hit radio stations in the United States
Mass media in Stockton, California
Mass media in San Joaquin County, California
Mass media in Stanislaus County, California
Modesto, California
Cumulus Media radio stations
Radio stations established in 1987
1987 establishments in California